Kandjidi Ningahar Otodjibaye (born 16 August 1995), known as Roméo Otodjibaye, is a Chadian professional footballer who plays as a midfielder for Zambia Super League club Indeni and the Chad national team.

Club career 
Otodjibaye signed for Zambian side Indeni in October 2020.

International career 
On 5 September 2019, Otodjibaye made his debut for the Chad national team in a 3–1 loss to Sudan in FIFA World Cup qualification.

References

External links 

 

1995 births
Living people
People from N'Djamena
Chadian footballers
Association football midfielders
Chad international footballers
Tourbillon FC players
Renaissance FC players
Aigle Royal Menoua players
Yong Sports Academy players
Union Douala players
Indeni F.C. players
Chad Premier League players
Elite One players
Zambia Super League players
Chadian expatriate footballers
Expatriate footballers in Cameroon
Expatriate footballers in Zambia
Chadian expatriate sportspeople in Cameroon
Chadian expatriate sportspeople in Zambia